Dangerous to Know is a 1938 American crime film directed by Robert Florey and starring Anna May Wong, Akim Tamiroff and Gail Patrick.  
The picture is based on British crime writer Edgar Wallace's hit 1930 play On the Spot which had been inspired by the career of Al Capone. The supporting cast features Lloyd Nolan and Anthony Quinn. The film's tagline was "No woman ever survived his love!"

Plot
Racketeer Steve Recka, art patron and political power-maker, rules his town and Madame Lan Ying, his beautiful Oriental friend and hostess, with an iron hand. He meets Margaret van Kase, a socialite impressed by neither his power nor his wealth, having no money herself.

Cast
 Anna May Wong as Madame Lan Ying
 Akim Tamiroff as Stephen Recka
 Gail Patrick as Margaret Van Case
 Lloyd Nolan as Inspector Brandon
 Harvey Stephens as Phillip Easton
 Anthony Quinn as Nicky Kusnoff
 Roscoe Karns as Duncan
 Porter Hall as Mayor Bradley
 Barlowe Borland as Butler
 Hedda Hopper as Mrs. Carson
 Hugh Sothern as Harvey Gregson
 Edward Pawley as John Rance
 Eddie Marr as Crouch 
 Harry Worth as Hanley
 Robert Brister as Councilman Murkil
 Pierre Watkin as Senator Carson

Reception
Bosley Crowther of The New York Times called the film a "second-rate melodrama, hardly worthy of the talents of its generally capable cast."

References

External links
 
 
 

1938 films
1930s English-language films
1938 crime films
American mystery films
Paramount Pictures films
Films based on works by Edgar Wallace
Films directed by Robert Florey
American black-and-white films
American crime films
1938 mystery films
Melodrama films
1930s American films